The Mitchell Building-First State Bank Building, at 222 Knox Street in Barbourville, Kentucky, is a Romanesque Revival-style building built in 1910.  It was listed on the National Register of Historic Places in 1984.

It is a three-story masonry wall and wood-frame building, with a Romanesque brick arch entry as its most salient feature.  The brickwork is in common bond with a quoin detail every sixth course. It was designed and built by Ed Dishman.

It was deemed notable as "the best example of the Romanesque Revival style in Barbourville."

References

National Register of Historic Places in Knox County, Kentucky
Romanesque Revival architecture in Kentucky
Commercial buildings completed in 1910
Barbourville, Kentucky
1910 establishments in Kentucky
Bank buildings on the National Register of Historic Places in Kentucky